Chirping may refer to: 
 Bird vocalization
 Chirping, the act of signaling with chirps, signals in which the frequency increases / decreases with time
 Chirping, pulse compression by linear frequency modulation
 Trash-talk in ice hockey

See also
 Chirp (disambiguation)
 Chirplet transform